Uniomerus is a genus of freshwater mussels, aquatic bivalve mollusks in the family Unionidae, the river mussels.

Species within the genus Uniomerus
 Uniomerus caroliniana
 Uniomerus columbensis
 Uniomerus declivis
 Uniomerus tetralasmus

Prehistoric species
 Uniomerus hanleyi

 
Bivalve genera